Rockwell Mound has been listed on the National Register of Historic Places since 1987. The mound is located in Rockwell Park, on North Orange Street in the Illinois River city of Havana in Mason County.

Rockwell Mound is one of the site that the Register has denoted as being "address restricted" because of its special sensitivity. Despite this designation by the Register the mound is operated as a park as of 2007.

History
Rockwell Mound is one of the largest mounds ever built in the Illinois River basin. The park that is on the site today is about six miles (10 km) from another Mississippian site on the Register in Illinois, Dickson Mounds.

See also
List of archaeological sites on the National Register of Historic Places in Illinois

Notes

External links
Article

Archaeological sites on the National Register of Historic Places in Illinois
Havana Hopewell culture
Protected areas of Mason County, Illinois
National Register of Historic Places in Mason County, Illinois
Parks in Illinois
Mounds in Illinois